The 2013 Players Tour Championship Grand Final (officially the 2013 Dafabet Players Tour Championship Grand Final) was a professional ranking snooker tournament that took place between 12 and 17 March 2013 at the Bailey Allen Hall in Galway, Republic of Ireland. It was the ninth ranking event of the 2012/2013 season.

Stephen Lee was the defending champion, but he couldn't compete due to his suspension from professional snooker.

Ding Junhui won his sixth ranking title by defeating Neil Robertson 4–3 in the final. Ding also made the 97th official maximum break during his quarter-final match against Mark Allen. This was Ding's fifth 147 break and the ninth in the 2012/2013 season. This was the 250th ranking event to be staged in snooker.

Prize fund and ranking points
The breakdown of prize money and ranking points of the event is shown below:

Seeding list
The players competed in 13 minor-ranking tournaments to earn points for the PTC and APTC Order of Merits. The seeding list of the Finals was based on the combined list from the earnings of both Order of Merits.

Main draw

Final

Century breaks

 147, 138, 133, 130, 130, 118, 108, 101  Ding Junhui
 134  Tom Ford
 125  Mark Allen
 118  John Higgins
 113  Alfie Burden
 105  Ken Doherty
 104  Marco Fu
 100  Martin Gould
 100  Barry Hawkins

References

External links

2013 in Irish sport
2013
Finals
Snooker competitions in Ireland
Sport at the University of Galway
Sport in Galway (city)